"The Strenuous Life" is the name of a speech given by New York Governor Theodore Roosevelt in Chicago, Illinois, on April 10, 1899. Based upon his personal experiences, he argued that strenuous effort and overcoming hardship were ideals to be embraced by Americans for the betterment of the nation and the world in the 20th century.

The speech
Roosevelt states the main point of his speech in the opening remarks:

An individual who puts great effort into his work and is not lazy, he claims, will be a success.  It is the duty of someone who does not engage in manual labor for a living to devote himself to the arts or sciences. He uses the citizens of Chicago and Illinois as examples of people who embody such a spirit.  Those who do not embrace the strenuous life, however, do not live meaningful lives.

As the speech continues, Roosevelt claims that the strenuous life can benefit not just the individual, but also the entire country.  He advocates imperialism as an extension of the strenuous life.  America must become involved in global affairs, or else it will suffer as a nation.  America must be a powerful country, and it must exert this power if it sees fit.  Such strength necessarily requires a strong military, and a strong military presence.  Roosevelt's concluding words tie together the importance of the strenuous life in the individual and the nation:

The speech was published in 1900 as part of a collection of other Roosevelt writings and addresses also entitled The Strenuous Life.

Importance
The speech reflected his own personality and life experience.  Roosevelt was sickly and asthmatic as a youngster, and had to sleep propped up in bed or slouching in a chair during much of his early childhood.  He was in poor physical condition as a result.  Roosevelt's father compelled the young Roosevelt to take up exercise, including boxing lessons in order to ward off bullies.

The influence stuck.  Upon graduating from Harvard University, Roosevelt underwent a physical examination and his doctor advised him that due to serious heart problems, he should find a desk job and avoid strenuous activity. Roosevelt disregarded the advice.  As an adult, he exercised regularly and took up boxing, tennis, hiking, rowing, polo, and horseback riding. As governor of New York, he boxed with sparring partners several times a week, a practice he regularly continued as President until one blow detached his left retina, leaving him blind in that eye (a fact not made public until many years later). Thereafter, he practiced jujutsu and continued his habit of skinny-dipping in the Potomac River during winter.

As a result, the phrase "the strenuous life" has become highly connected to Roosevelt's life.  Nathan Miller's biography of Roosevelt, Theodore Roosevelt: A Life, begins by saying that "the strenuous life" is one of "the things that immediately come to mind when Theodore Roosevelt's name is mentioned."

The speech also reflected the American spirit at the turn of the 20th century.  The increasing industrialization and urbanization of America led many to become fearful of growing weak.  College sports were on the rise, as were recreational athletics such as bicycling.  American culture embraced masculinity, patriotism, and nationalism.  Issues of masculinity were especially predominant during this time, given the various women's movements of the age.  Critics and scholars, including author Henry James, worried about a femininization of America.  The time was ripe for Roosevelt to extol the masculine virtues of the strenuous life.  Roosevelt used the speech to justify American imperialism as well.

In popular culture

 Scott Joplin wrote a rag called "The Strenuous Life".
 Sarah Vowell's collection of essays entitled The Partly Cloudy Patriot includes one entitled "The Strenuous Life."  Vowell compares her life to Roosevelt's, especially her lack of strenuousness, and refers to the speech directly.
 Kathleen Dalton's biography of Roosevelt is entitled Theodore Roosevelt: A Strenuous Life.
 A character in Lyonel Feininger's 1906 comic page for the Chicago Tribune, The Kin-der-Kids was named "Strenuous Teddy."
Ryan Swanson chronicles Roosevelt's relationship with sports in The Strenuous Life: Theodore Roosevelt and the Making of the American Athlete.

See also
 No pain, no gain
 Risk
 Simple living

References

External links
 The Strenuous Life speech Text from Wikisource

Speeches by Theodore Roosevelt
History of Chicago
1897 speeches